Plesina is a genus of parasitic flies in the family Tachinidae. There are about nine described species in Plesina.

Species
These nine species belong to the genus Plesina:
 Plesina africana Kugler, 1978
 Plesina asiatica Richter, 1988
 Plesina claripennis Mesnil, 1953
 Plesina deserticola Kugler, 1978
 Plesina fascipennis (Wiedemann, 1830)
 Plesina nepalensis Kugler, 1982
 Plesina nigroscutellata Cerretti & Tschorsnig, 2008
 Plesina phalerata (Meigen, 1824)
 Plesina zimini Richter, 1991

References

Further reading

 
 
 
 

Tachinidae
Articles created by Qbugbot